An Institute of Molecular Medicine, or IMM for short, may refer to a scientific research institution in molecular medicine:

Norway
Department of Cancer research and Molecular Medicine at the Norwegian University of Science and Technology.

Portugal
Instituto de Medicina Molecular (Institute of Molecular Medicine), a research institution of the University of Lisbon, in Lisbon, Portugal.

United States
The Brown Foundation Institute of Molecular Medicine for the Prevention of Human Diseases, molecular medicine institute of The University of Texas Health Science Center at Houston.

United Kingdom
The Weatherall Institute of Molecular Medicine, at the University of Oxford.